Babiacetus is an extinct genus of early cetacean that lived during the late Lutetian middle Eocene of India.
It was named after its type locality, the Harudi Formation in the Babia Hills (: paleocoordinates ), Kutch District, Gujarat, India.

Gingerich and colleagues found a skull (GSP-UM 3005, much of a skull and lower jaws) while collecting a skeleton of a new species of Protosiren (Protosiren sattaensis) in the Drazinda Formation (paleocoordinates ) in the Sulaiman Range of Punjab, Pakistan.  described both the original find and their new specimen.
 described B. mishrai from the specimen (RUSB 2512, a partial skull) collected in the Harudi Formation.

Babiacetus is one of the larger protocetids.  Its hydrodynamic skull and pointed, anteroposteriorly (front-back) oriented incisors are typical of archaeocetes.  A densely ossified auditory bulla and large mandibular canal indicate it was adapted for hearing in water.  Babiacetus differs from pakicetids and ambulocetids (more primitive families) by the large mandibular foramen and a medially concave ascending ramus; distinct from remingtonocetids and basilosaurids (more derived families) by the single-cusped trigonid and talonid on the lower molars.  Its long synostotic (fused) mandibular symphysis, which reaches as far back as P2, distinguishes it from Pappocetus and Georgiacetus (other protocetids).  Its auditory bulla is more narrow than Rodhocetus'.  Babiacetus lacks the prominent molar protocone present in Indocetus.
The anterior premolars are large.

Its large size as well as robust teeth suggest that it fed on larger fishes or aquatic vertebrates, or both. To date, only cranial remains have been found, hence nothing is known of Babicetus' mode of locomotion or degree of aquatic adaptation.

The mandible is longer in B. indicus than in B. mishrai, and P1 is single-rooted in the former but double-rooted in the latter.  The diastemata between P1 and P4 in B. indicus is absent in B. mishrai.  B. indicus has larger cheek teeth and a larger M3.

Notes

References

 
 
 
 

Protocetidae
Prehistoric cetacean genera
Fossil taxa described in 1984
Extinct animals of India